Leila Gurruwiwi (born 1988) is an Australian media commentator and television show producer. She is a panel member on The Marngrook Footy Show and co-producer of an up-coming reality TV show with the working title Dance Off, currently being filmed in Arnhem Land.

Career 
Gurruwiwi began her career on radio station 3KND in Melbourne. When Grant Hansen first created the popular television show The Marngrook Footy Show in 2007, he invited her to work as a reporter. Having been with the show since its inception, she is often mentioned as voicing the perspectives of two under-represented groups in the AFL community: women and Indigenous Australians. Gurruwiwi's presence on the show, along with her colleague Shelley Ware, is specifically calculated to make women feel more comfortable and represented. The situation is analogous to the dearth of Indigenous representation which spawned the original idea for the Marngrook Footy Show; 50% of AFL club memberships are held by women and yet that level of participation is not reflected in the associated media.

Gurruwiwi's particular interest in Indigenous culture led to her co-producing a show with the working title "Dance Off" currently filming in Arnhem Land, Northern Territory. The show focuses on groups of Indigenous dancers competing in a dancing competition and their cultural ties. It also led to her emceeing the Survival Day activities in Belgrave in 2011.

Filmography

Personal life 
Gurruwiwi was born in north-east Arnhem Land and is one of a group of eight siblings. She is the first cousin of Geoffrey Gurrumul Yunupingu.

Gurruwiwi moved to Bendigo at 18 months of age in order to have a better education. She learnt English in school there, having previously only spoken an Indigenous language. She was educated at St Killian's Primary school and later Bendigo Catholic College.

At the age of 12 she spent 6 months in hospital with pneumonia, which severely reduced her lung capacity.  This prevented her from ever playing sports or singing professionally, which had been her ambitions, and eventually led to her choice of a career in the media. Gurruwiwi also overcame significant self-esteem issues stemming from bullying in order to find a place for herself in the public eye.

References

External links 

Australian film actresses
Australian television actresses
Australian television producers
Australian women television producers
Australian television presenters
Living people
1988 births
21st-century Australian actresses
Australian women television presenters